Locusta migratoria cinerascens is a subspecies of the migratory locust (L. migratoria) in the family Acrididae.

Distribution
This species is present in Italy and Spain.

Bibliography
 Fontana, Buzzetti, Cogo & Odé. 2002. Guida al riconoscimento e allo studio di cavallette, grilli, mantidi e insetti affini del Veneto: Blattaria, Mantodea, Isoptera, Orthoptera, Phasmatodea, Dermaptera, Embidiina 432 - Locusta migratoria cinerascens
 Herrera. 1982. Ser. Entomol. 22:77 - Locusta migratoria cinerascens
 Rakotondrainibe K, Nicolas G, Fuzeau-Braesch S. Phase morphometric differences among Locusta migratoria cinerascens, Locusta migratoria migratorioides, and their mutant albinos (Orthoptera)
 Suzel Fuzeau-Braesch, Gerard Nicolas, Jean-Claude Baehr, Patrick Porcheron  A study of hormonal levels of the locust Locusta migratoria cinerascens artificially changed to the solitary state by a chronic CO2 treatment of one minute per day

References

Locusts
Orthoptera of Europe